Eunuch & Carpenter  is a Taiwanese television series set in the period when the eunuch Wei Zhongxian controlled the court. It was first broadcast in Taiwan on TTV from 15 November 1993 to 7 January 1994 .

Cast 
Ke Huy Quan as Ba Da-jia (voice by )
 as Yuan Xiao-yu
 Feng Ku as 
  as Zhang Qian
  as Li Jin-zhong (then Wei Zhongxian)
  as Madame Ke
  as Zhang Ben-ru
 Shao-feng Cheng as Yuan Bu-fan
 Siqin Gaowa as Consort Li
 Wen-shu Yang as Noble Consort Zheng
  as Crown prince (then Tianqi Emperor)
  as Ke Guang-xian
 as Taichang Emperor
 Kuei-Pei Chiang as 
  as Ba Da-zhu
 Heng Yu as 
 Ling Huang as Empress Zhang
  as Zhu You-jian

References

External links 
Eunuch & Carpenter on TTV’s official site
All the episodes on TTV’s official Youtube Channel

1993 Taiwanese television series debuts
1994 Taiwanese television series endings
Taiwanese television series
Television series set in the Ming dynasty
1990s Taiwanese television series
Television series set in the 17th century